4th Reserve Division() was formed in August 1955 in Chengdu Military Region. On February 15 1956, the division moved to Bishan, Sichuan.

As of its activation the division was composed of:
10th Reserve Regiment;
11th Reserve Regiment;
12th Reserve Regiment;
Artillery Regiment;
Anti-Aircraft Artillery Regiment;
Sergeant Training Regiment.

The division was fully manned and equipped. During its short-lived existence the division was focused on the training of officers and sergeants.

In March 1958 the division was demobilized, moving to Heilongjiang for agricultural missions.

References

Codification Committee of the Annals of Sichuan Province, Sichuan Shengzhi Junshizhi [Annals of Sichuan Province - Military Annals], Chengdu, Sichuan People's Publishing House, 1999, p.85

R04
Military units and formations established in 1955
Military units and formations disestablished in 1958
Reserve divisions of the People's Liberation Army